Berta Rosenbaum Golahny (February 7, 1925 – November 4, 2005) was an American painter, printmaker, and sculptor.

Biography
Golahny was born in 1925 in Detroit, Michigan to Jewish immigrants, Fannie Henkin Rosenbaum (1889–1953, b. in Beshankovichy, Belarus) and Gedaliah Rosenbaum (1889–1985, b. in Włodawa, Poland). As a child, Golahny began to draw while watching her father design wrought-iron pieces for the company he founded, Liberty Ironworks, some of whose ornamental gates and railings remain standing in Detroit.

She was educated at Detroit’s Cass Technical High School and then in 1943-4 the Art Students League of New York, having received a National Scholarship. There, George Grosz encouraged her drawing and French artist Ossip Zadkine introduced her to sculpture.

Golahny continued her studies at the Art Institute of Chicago. After receiving her Bachelor's in Fine Art from the Art Institute in 1947, Golahny completed her studies at the University of Iowa, from which she received a Master's in Fine Art in 1950. At Iowa, she studied printmaking under Mauricio Lasansky, art history under William S. Heckscher, and painting under Eugene Ludins. Her thesis painting, The Resurrection, was awarded the Painting Prize by juror Ben Shahn. In 1951, she was awarded a fellowship from The Louis Comfort Tiffany Foundation. While at Iowa, she married Yehuda Golahny, an engineering student in Detroit. When Yehuda began to pursue a Master’s of Science in Electrical Engineering at MIT (class of 1954), the couple moved to Cambridge, Massachusetts. After two years, they moved to Newton, Massachusetts, where they settled.

From 1959 to 2001, she taught at the Cambridge Center for Adult Education. The Center now gives an annual award in her honor. She exhibited in the US and other countries in several hundred juried and invitational shows, and was very well reviewed. Today her work is held in private collections in America, France, and Israel, and in museums including the Fogg Art Museum at Harvard University, the Boston Athenaeum, the Wichita Art Museum, the Williams College Art Museum, the Palmer Museum of Art at Penn State University, the Ackland Art Museum at the University of North Carolina at Chapel Hill, and the E. J. Pratt Library at the University of Toronto.

Golahny used the traditional media of etching, wood engraving, and woodcut. She experimented with monotype, with different ways of biting the plate, and with electric tools to incise lines upon zinc and copper plates.

Artists with whom Golahny found affinity include Max Beckmann, Paul Cézanne, Wassily Kandinsky, Paul Klee, Franz Marc, and Nicolas de Staël.

Golahny’s earliest work uses a darker palette and rougher line than her later work. This early work, such as Street Car Scene, reflects city life in Detroit, New York City, and Chicago: people on buses or trains, workers in factories, and children at play.

One series of works, begun around 1964 with a multi-block color woodcut, was titled Landscape of Man in Nuclear Age. The series continued in intaglio, painting, wood engraving, and copper engraving, and was completed in 1988. Golahny repeatedly portrayed human suffering, as in a series of works on the Holocaust.

A visit to a Midwest state fair inspired an intaglio print of 1949 titled Children at the Fair: The Ride. Golahny reprised this composition of a whirligig (a central pole with carts swinging from it) in a 1987 woodcut and in several subsequent large paintings.

Inspired by publications on nebulae and black holes, Golahny began the Space series in 1980. In dozens of paintings she modeled her images on photographs of cosmic exploration in the archives of the Harvard College Observatory. She also painted evocative layerings of an imagined passage through space and time, and fantastic semi-formed creatures. Art historian Alicia Faxon wrote of one of Golahny's paintings of the Crab Nebula, "Golahny's Crab Nebula . . . capture[s] the process of creation, a process that takes place both in the creation of the nebula and in the gestation of the painting itself. . . . In comparing Crab Nebula to the photographs that inspired the work, it is fascinating to see how much more vivid and complex the artist's interpretation is. The photographs appear static; the painting pulses with energy, embodying an endless universe in creation."

The Being and Becoming series concerns the expansion of the universe since the Big Bang. Inspired by this series and other paintings, Boston-based musicians Paul and Rosalie DiCrescenzo wrote a four-movement score to accompany a slide-show of the images, titled The Watchers and the Watched. This was performed with support from the Massachusetts Council on the Arts in 1995. It was performed again at the Newton Free Library in December 2006 in commemoration of Golahny’s life and work. Golahny died in November 2005.

Her response to the World Trade Center attacks of September 11, 2001 was to paint two large canvases in a series called The Striving.

In Spring 2018, Lycoming College (Williamsport, PA) hosted a large exhibition of her work, titled "Berta Golahny: The Human Abstract."

References

1925 births
2005 deaths
Artists from Detroit
American people of Belarusian-Jewish descent
American people of Polish-Jewish descent
20th-century American painters
21st-century American painters
20th-century American sculptors
20th-century American printmakers
American women painters
20th-century American women artists
21st-century American women artists
Sculptors from Michigan
Jewish American artists
Jewish women painters
Jewish painters
Jewish women sculptors
American women printmakers
20th-century American Jews
21st-century American Jews